Neodiplostomum is a genus of flatworms belonging to the family Diplostomidae.

The genus has almost cosmopolitan distribution..

Species:

Neodiplostomum aluconis 
Neodiplostomum americanum
Neodiplostomum attenuatum 
Neodiplostomum auritum 
Neodiplostomum canaliculatum 
Neodiplostomum conicum 
Neodiplostomum ellipticum 
Neodiplostomum elongatum 
Neodiplostomum haliaetum 
Neodiplostomum intermedium
Neodiplostomum major 
Neodiplostomum microcotyle 
Neodiplostomum morchelloides 
Neodiplostomum obscurum 
Neodiplostomum oriolinum 
Neodiplostomum seoulense 
Neodiplostomum spathoides 
Neodiplostomum spathula 
Neodiplostomum spathulaeforme 
Neodiplostomum toruligenitale
Neodiplostomum travassosi

References

Platyhelminthes